Denz is a surname. Notable people with the surname include:

Cornelia Denz (born 1963), German physicist
Nico Denz (born 1994), German racing cyclist
Peter Denz (born 1940), German engineer, inventor, entrepreneur and Oscar winner
Silvio Denz (born 1956 ), Swiss entrepreneur and winemaker